= Sermo =

Online community for verified healthcare professionals

- Website type: Social network
- Headquarters: Cambridge, Massachusetts
- Website: www.sermo.com
- Users: 1,500,000

Sermo is an online community exclusively for verified health care professionals. As of 2024, the platform claims to support over 1.5 million members from more than 150 countries. This includes general practitioners, specialists, residents, and advanced practice providers — as well as hundreds of additional healthcare roles ranging from subspecialist physicians and specialist nurses to pharmacists, lab technicians, and administrative decision-makers. Members engage in anonymous peer consultations, collaborative medical crowdsourcing, participation in paid surveys, and access to exclusive clinical and non-clinical content. Sermo is widely used by physicians to earn supplemental income, share complex cases, and access real-world insights from colleagues across specialties and geographies. According to a 2025 episode of 'The PA Is In' podcast, many APP members actively leverage these paid surveys, earning significant supplementary income on the platform. Members also access exclusive clinical and non-clinical content, sharing complex cases and real-world insights with colleagues across specialties and geographies.

The platform has also been cited in academic research and industry studies for its role in surfacing physician sentiment on healthcare trends, medical policies, and emerging clinical issues.]

== History ==
Sermo was founded in 2005 by physician Dr. Daniel Palestrant as a platform for adverse event reporting, following the Merck Vioxx (Rofecoxib) recall in 2004. In 2007, the company raised $26.7 million in venture funding, followed by an additional $3.5 million in 2011. In 2012, Sermo was acquired by WorldOne, a healthcare research company founded by Peter Kirk. The platform was rebranded to "SERMO" in 2014, before reverting to "Sermo" in 2019. The company expanded into English-speaking countries including Canada, the UK, Ireland, Australia, New Zealand, and South Africa, followed by Spain and Mexico in 2014–15. In 2023, Sermo acquired Payer Access and Charter Oak. In 2025, it publicly launched its Drug Ratings tool and relaunched the Sermo Mobile platform

== Reach and community ==
Sermo supports a broad range of medical specialties spanning the full spectrum of clinical practice, from general medicine to highly subspecialized fields and advanced practice providers. This includes, among others, oncology, hematology, cardiology, gastroenterology, endocrinology, immunology, infectious disease, rheumatology, dermatology, ophthalmology, pulmonology, neurology, and nephrology. In 2014, U.S. physicians posted over 3,500 cases, generating 50,000 comments and 700,000 views. Most received responses within 1.5 hours and were resolved in under 24 hours.

== Sermo surveys ==
Sermo surveys capture physician insights on clinical and policy issues. Topics have included vaccine confidence, burnout, misinformation, and COVID-19. Findings have been cited in Forbes, The Guardian, Reuters, and NEJM Catalyst.

== Drug ratings ==
Sermo's Drug Ratings Directory, launched in 2017 ] and made public in 2025, includes over 1.2 million physician-submitted ratings. Only triple-verified physicians can contribute. Ratings are visible to APPs, pharmacists, and the public via the Drug Ratings directory.

Ratings are scored across safety, efficacy, tolerability, accessibility, and adherence. Additional data from FDA and Elsevier supplements the reviews.

== Sermo Mobile ==
Sermo Mobile allows physicians to call patients without sharing personal numbers. Users can assign a clinic or office ID to outgoing calls and make unlimited domestic and international calls via Wi-Fi or cellular networks. The feature is free for Sermo members. .

== Partnerships and collaboration ==
Sermo has worked with research institutions, public health agencies, and NGOs on studies related to vaccine attitudes, healthcare policy, and global physician sentiment.

== Awards ==
Sermo has received recognition from Fast Company (Most Innovative Companies in Healthcare and PM360’s Trailblazer Awards for Best Digital Initiative.

== Use in research and media ==
Sermo has been cited in a variety of peer-reviewed journals and news outlets. Media mentions include: Forbes

Reuters

New York Times

The Guardian

Washington Post

Los Angeles Times

Time
